Prophysaon, common name taildropper slugs, is a genus of air-breathing land slugs, terrestrial pulmonate gastropod mollusks in the family Ariolimacidae. 

These slugs can self-amputate (autotomy) a portion of their tail. This autotomy has been observed in the species Prophysaon andersoni.

Distribution 
This genus of slugs occurs in North America, including California and Oregon.

Species 
Species in the genus Prophysaon include 10 species (9 according to Turgeon et al. 1998 plus one known undescribed species):
 Prophysaon andersoni (J. G. Cooper, 1872) - Reticulate Taildropper, Anderson's Taildropper Slug
 Prophysaon boreale Pilsbry, 1948 - Northern Taildropper
 Prophysaon coeruleum Cockerell, 1890 - Blue-Gray Taildropper
 Prophysaon dubium Cockerell, 1890 - Papillose Taildropper
 Prophysaon fasciatum Cockerell in W. G. Binney - Banded Taildropper
 Prophysaon foliolatum (Gould, 1851) - Yellow-bordered Taildropper
 Prophysaon humile Cockerell, 1890 - Smoky Taildropper
 Prophysaon obscurum (Cockerell, 1890) - Mottled Taildropper
 Prophysaon vanattae Pilsbry, 1948 - Scarlet-backed Taildropper
 Prophysaon vanattae var. pardalis
 Prophysaon undescribed species from Siskiyou County, California.
Species brought into synonymy
 Prophysaon flavum Cockerell, 1890: synonym of Prophysaon andersonii (J.G. Cooper, 1872)
 Prophysaon hemphilli Bland & W. G. Binney, 1873: synonym of Prophysaon andersonii (J.G. Cooper, 1872)
 Prophysaon pacificum Cockerell, 1890: synonym of Prophysaon andersonii (J.G. Cooper, 1872)

References

External links 
 information about Prophysaon andersoni: http://www.livinglandscapes.bc.ca/cbasin/molluscs/arionidae.html
 Wilke T. & Duncan N. 2004. Phylogeographical patterns in the American Pacific Northwest: lessons from the arionid slug Prophysaon coeruleum. Molecular Ecology, volume 13, issue 8, pages 2303-2315.
 Prophysaon sp. 1 A Terrestrial Slug. NatureServe Explorer.

Ariolimacidae